Catherine M. Abate (December 8, 1947 – May 17, 2014) was a New York State Senator. She was also a former commissioner of New York City's Correction Department.

Abate was of Italian ancestry. Her father was Joseph Abate, a longtime member of the Lucchese crime family. She was born on December 8, 1947, in Atlantic City, New Jersey. She received her bachelor's degree from Vassar College in 1969 and her law degree from Boston University School of Law in 1972. After graduating, she first attracted attention for her work as a young lawyer at New York City's  Legal Aid Society.

New York Governor Mario Cuomo appointed her as the executive deputy commissioner of the State Division of Human Rights. In 1988, she was appointed to head the state's Crime Victim's Board. She was an attorney in New York City and was director of training in the criminal defense division. She also  on the Governor's Task Force on Rape and Sexual Assault. In 1992, then-New York City Mayor David Dinkins appointed Abate as City Commissioner for the Department of Corrections. The New Jersey-born Democrat served two terms (1995–1999), representing a district in Manhattan. In 1998, she gave up her seat to run for New York State Attorney General. Abate lost the Democratic primary to Eliot Spitzer. After leaving politics, she spent fifteen years working as President/CEO of the Community Healthcare Network.

Death
Abate died on May 17, 2014, aged 66, in Bellevue Hospital from uterine cancer.

References

External links
Our Campaigns: Catherine M. Abate profile; accessed May 18, 2014.

1947 births
2014 deaths
Women state legislators in New York (state)
Democratic Party New York (state) state senators
Deaths from cancer in New York (state)
Deaths from uterine cancer
Vassar College alumni
Boston University School of Law alumni
New York (state) lawyers
20th-century American politicians
20th-century American women politicians
20th-century American lawyers
21st-century American women politicians
American people of Italian descent